Southfront Road is a planned railway station in Livermore, California. It is a stop on the planned Valley Link system. Rush hour short turn Valley Link trains would operate from here to Dublin/Pleasanton. Service is expected to start as early as 2028.

Planning history
A rail station at the base of the Altamont Pass in Livermore was seen as ideal to the development of industry and the nearby Lawrence Livermore National Laboratory. Greenville Road's proximity to both Interstate 580 and the Union Pacific Railroad Oakland Subdivision made it a potential interchange point between a planned Bay Area Rapid Transit expansion and the Altamont Corridor Express. When BART was forced to abandon its Livermore extension, planning for an interchange between the two systems was undertaken by the Tri-Valley-San Joaquin Valley Regional Rail Authority as part of Valley Link. However, as a result of the environmental review process for the new line, the station was moved away from the Union Pacific Line and to the Interstate 580 median between the Vasco and First/Springwell interchanges with access from Southfront Road.

References

Livermore, California
Railway stations scheduled to open in 2028
Future Valley Link stations